The 1991 Stanford Cardinal football team represented Stanford University in the 1991 NCAA Division I-A football season. It would be Dennis Green's final season as the head coach.

Regular season
Tommy Vardell rushed for 1,843 yards with 37 touchdowns in his college career. He never fumbled once for Stanford, and ranks second in Stanford football history for most touchdowns and third for most rushing yards. Vardell set the record for most rushing yards in a season by a Cardinal running back, with his 1084 yards in 1991.

Stanford’s win over USC in October - its first over the Trojans since 1975, and only its fourth since 1957 - signaled a remarkable change in that rivalry’s competitiveness, as the two teams have shared wins roughly evenly in the succeeding years.

Schedule

Roster

Rankings

Game summaries

Washington

Colorado

Notre Dame

California

vs. Georgia Tech (Aloha Bowl)

1992 NFL Draft

Awards and honors
Tommy Vardell, School Record, Most Rushing Yards in One Season, 1084 yards

References

Stanford
Stanford Cardinal football seasons
Stanford Cardinal football